A yogi is a practitioner of Yoga, including a sannyasin or practitioner of meditation in Indian religions.  The feminine form, sometimes used in English, is yogini.

Yogi has since the 12th century CE also denoted members of the Nath siddha tradition of Hinduism, and in Hinduism, Buddhism and Jainism, a practitioner of tantra. In Hindu mythology, the god Shiva and the goddess Parvati are depicted as an emblematic yogi–yogini pair.

Etymology

In Classical Sanskrit, the word yogi (Sanskrit: masc , योगी; fem ) is derived from yogin, which refers to a practitioner of yoga. Yogi is technically male, and yoginī  is the term used for female practitioners. The two terms are still used with those meanings today, but the word yogi is also used generically to refer to both male and female practitioners of yoga and related meditative practices belonging to any religion or spiritual method.

The term yogini is also used for divine goddesses and enlightened mothers, all revered as aspects of the mother goddess, Devi.

A yogi, states Banerjea, should not be confused with someone practicing asceticism and excessive self-mortification.

Hinduism
In Hinduism the term yogi refers to an adherent of yoga.

Textual references

The earliest evidence of yogis and their spiritual tradition, states Karel Werner, is found in the Keśin hymn 10.136 of the Rigveda, though with the terminology of Rudra who evolved into Shiva worshipped as the lord of Yoga in later Hinduism. The Hindu scripture Rigveda uses words of admiration for the Yogis, whom it refers to as Kesin, and describes them as follows (abridged):

The term yogin appears in Katyayana Shrauta-sutra and chapter 6 of Maitri Upanishad, where the implied context and meaning is "a follower of the Yoga system, a contemplative saint".

The term sometimes refers to a person who belongs to the Natha tradition. They usually belong to Shaiva tradition, but some Natha belong to the Vaishnava tradition. In both cases, states David Lorenzen, they practice yoga and their principal god tends to be Nirguna, that is a god that is without form and semi-monistic, influenced in the medieval era by the Advaita Vedanta school of Hinduism, Madhyamaka school of Buddhism, as well as Tantra and Yogic practices.

The Yoga-Bhashya (400 CE), the oldest extant commentary on the Yoga-Sutra offers the following fourfold classification of yogis:
 Prathama-kalpika (neophyte/beginner, devotional)  
 Madhu-bhumika (one who has begun to enjoy the spiritual pursuits without effort)
 Prajna-jyoti (the advanced practitioner who knows spiritual concepts)
 Atikranta- bhavaniya (those who have attained what can be taught, achieved siddhas, and are on their personal path to ultimate insights)

Sexuality
A yogi or yogini aspires to Brahmacharya (Sanskrit: ब्रह्मचर्य), which means celibacy if single, or non-cheating on one's partner.

There have been two parallel views, in Hindu texts, on sexuality for a yogi and yogini. One view asserts restraint in sexual activity, towards monk- and nun-like asexuality, as transmutation away from worldly desires and onto a spiritual path. It is not considered, states Stuart Sovatsky, as a form of moralistic repression but a personal choice that empowers the yoga practitioner to redirect his or her energies. The second view, found particularly in Tantra traditions according to David Gordon White, asserts that sexuality is an additional means for a yogi or yogini to journey towards and experience the bliss of "one realized god-consciousness for oneself". In the second view, sexuality is a yogic practice, and one broadly revered through the lingam–yoni iconography of Shiva–Parvati, the divine yogi–yogini in Hindu mythology.

Ethical duties

A yogi or yogini lives by other voluntary ethical precepts called Yamas and Niyamas. These include:
 
 Ahiṃsā (अहिंसा): nonviolence, non-harming other living beings
 Satya (सत्य): truthfulness, non-falsehood
 Asteya (अस्तेय): not stealing
 Dayā (दया): kindness, compassion
 Ārjava (आर्जव): non-hypocrisy, sincerity
 Kṣamā (क्षमा): forgiveness
 Dhṛti (धृति): fortitude
 Mitāhāra (मितहार): moderation in diet both in terms of quantity and quality
 Śauca (शौच): purity, cleanliness
 Tapas: austerity, persistence and perseverance in one's purpose
 Santoṣa: contentment, acceptance of others and of one's circumstances as they are, optimism for self
 Dāna: generosity, charity, sharing with others

Nath siddha

According to David White,

Respect
Archeological evidence suggests that in some contexts and regions, yogi of the Nath Siddha tradition were respected and recognized in India. For example, inscriptions suggest a general of the Yadava king Ramacandra donated a village to a yogi in 13th-century. Near Mangalore, that later became a hub of Nath yogis, a monastery and temple was dedicated to yogis in the 10th century.

David Lorenzen states that the Nath yogis have been very popular with the rural population in South Asia, with medieval era "tales and stories about Nath yogis such as Gorakhnath, Matsyendra, Jalandhar, Gopichand, Bharthari, Kanhapa and Chaurangi" continuing to be remembered in contemporary times, in the Deccan, western and northern states of India and in Nepal.

Persecution
In some contexts, adds White, the term yogi has also been a pejorative term used in medieval India for a Nath siddha, particularly on the part of India's social, cultural and religious elites. The term siddha has become a broad sectarian appellation, applying to Saiva-devotees in the Deccan (Maheśvara siddhas), alchemists in Tamil Nadu (siddhars or sittars), a group of early Buddhist tantrikas from Bengal (mahasiddhas, siddhacaryas), the alchemists of medieval India (rasa siddha), and a mainly north Indian group known as the Nath siddhas. The Nath siddhas are the only still existing representatives of the medieval Tantric tradition, which had disappeared due to its excesses. While the Nath siddhas enjoyed persistent popular success, they attracted the scorn of the elite classes.

According to White, the term yogi, has "for at least eight hundred years, been an all-purpose term employed to designate those Saiva specialists whom orthodox Hindus have considered suspect, heterodox, and even heretical in their doctrine and practice". The yoga as practiced by these Yogis, states White, is more closely identified in the eyes of those critics with black magic, sorcery and sexual perversions than with yoga in the conventional sense of the word.

The Nath Yogis were targets of Islamic persecution in the Mughal Empire.  The texts of Yogi traditions from this period, state Shail Mayaram, refer to oppressions by Mughal officials such as governor. The Mughal documents confirm the existence of Nath Yogis in each pargana (household neighborhoods), and their persecution wherein Nath Yogis were beheaded by Aurangzeb.

Resistance to persecution
According to David Lorenzen, the religious groups in Hinduism that militarized and took up arms following the Muslim conquest of India, to resist persecution, appeared among the Nath or Kanphata yogis, often called simply yogis or jogis.

The warrior ascetics were institutionalized as a religious order by Gorakhnath and were expanding in the 13th century, after the establishment of the first Islamic Sultanate in India. They interacted and cooperated with fakirs of Sufi Muslims. The yogis feature prominently in Delhi Sultanate and Mughal Empire period official documents, states David White, both in terms of impressing the ruling elite in the Muslim administration and awards of receiving land grants in some cases such as by Akbar, as well as those yogis who targeted the elite merchants and disrupted the business of administrative Islamic elites in urban areas. In other cases, yogis from the Shaivism, Vaishnavism and Shaktism traditions of Hinduism marshaled armed resistance against the Mughal and British colonial armies.

Cultural contributions: founding Hindu temples
The history of Nath yogis has been diverse, such as in the 11th and 12th centuries, when Buddhists in South India converted to Nath siddha traditions and helped establish Shiva Hindu temples and monasteries.

See also

 List of yoga schools
 List of Hindu gurus and sants
 Ngagpa
 Rishi

Notes

References

Sources

External links

Asceticism
 
Titles and occupations in Hinduism
Vajrayana Buddhists
Jain religious occupations